Słobity-Stacja Kolejowa  is a village in the administrative district of Gmina Wilczęta, within Braniewo County, Warmian-Masurian Voivodeship, in northern Poland.

Its name means "Słobity Railway Station", the village being adjacent to the PKP (Polish State Railways) station serving the nearby village of Słobity. 

The village has a population of 118.

References

Villages in Braniewo County